Alembe is a small town in western Gabon.

Transport 
It is served by a station of the Trans-Gabon Railway.

See also 
 Transport in Gabon

References 

Populated places in Moyen-Ogooué Province